Suibne (died c. AD 891) was a medieval Irish scribe at the abbey of Clonmacnoise, described as the "most excellent scribe" by the Annals of Ulster and the "wisest of the Scots" by the Annals of Wales.

His father was Maclume.

References

Irish scribes
Medieval European scribes
9th-century Irish writers
891 deaths
Year of death uncertain
Year of birth unknown